John Preston Davis (January 19, 1905 – September 11, 1973) was an American journalist, lawyer and activist intellectual, who became prominent for his work with the Joint Committee on National Recovery (JCNR). In 1935, he co-founded the National Negro Congress, an organization dedicated to the advancement of African Americans during the Great Depression.

In 1946, he founded Our World magazine, a full-size, nationally distributed publication for African-American readers. He also published the American Negro Reference Book, covering virtually every aspect of African-American life, present and past.

Biography
John P. Davis was born in Washington, D.C., the son of Dr. William Henry Davis and Julia Davis. His father was a graduate of Howard University and served as principal of Armstrong High School. During World War I, Dr. Davis was appointed as Secretary to Dr. Emmett Jay Scott, Special Assistant to the United States Secretary of War. In the 1920s, Dr. Davis served as Secretary to the Presidential Commission investigating the economic conditions in the Virgin Islands.

The early years
Davis attended segregated schools in Washington, D.C., graduating from the elite Dunbar High School, which stressed an academic curriculum. In 1922, he enrolled in Bates College in Lewiston, Maine. He graduated in 1926, earning an A.B. and double honors in English and Psychology. At Bates, he was president of Delta Sigma Rho, an honorary debating fraternity, and editor of the student publication The Bobcat. He enlisted the aid of Bates trustee Louis B. Costello, when Delta Sigma Rho's national council denied him membership because of his race.

Davis toured Europe with the Bates College debating team. He was among the first African-American men to be sent overseas under the auspices of the American University Union to engage in international debate; his team from Bates met and defeated Cambridge University. While an undergraduate at Bates College, Davis was nominated for a Rhodes scholarship. He contributed short stories to The Crisis, official magazine of the NAACP, and Opportunity: A Journal of Negro Life, published by the National Urban League. His short story "The Overcoat" was a prize-winner in Opportunitys 1926–27 literary contest.
 
With his literary interests, Davis was drawn into the Harlem Renaissance. After college, he moved to New York City, where for a time, he replaced the celebrated scholar W. E. B. Du Bois as literary editor of The Crisis. During this period, Davis joined with other young black writers – Zora Neale Hurston, Langston Hughes, Gwendolyn Bennett, Wallace Thurman, Aaron Douglas, Richard Bruce – to produce Fire!!, a magazine devoted to young African-American artists.

Harvard University
Davis had a fellowship to Harvard University from 1926 to 1927, and earned his master's degree in Journalism. He left Harvard to join the staff of Fisk University, a historically black college in Nashville, where he served as Director of Publicity from (1927 to 1928). He returned to Harvard University and earned an LLB degree from Harvard Law School in 1933.

At Harvard, Davis cemented lifelong friendships with a small core of black students, including fellow Dunbar High School alumni Robert C. Weaver, later appointed as the first black member of a Presidential cabinet; William Hastie, later appointed as the first black federal judge; and Ralph Bunche, later a statesman and diplomat who was awarded a Nobel Prize for Peace.

These friends remained important to Davis throughout his career. During their student years, the men discussed race and politics, especially the inadequacy of the black Republican leadership. When the Great Depression intensified the social and economic problems confronting black America, Davis and his colleagues looked to the example of Reconstruction, when federal power was used to redress the plight of former slaves. They called on the federal government to ensure black civil and political rights. The New Deal of Franklin D. Roosevelt seemed to offer the possibility of federal intervention for economic justice.

Marriage and family
Davis married Marguerite DeMond, the daughter of Reverend Abraham Lincoln DeMond and Lula Watkins (Patterson) DeMond. Marguerite had attended Avery Normal Institute in Charleston, South Carolina, operated by the American Missionary Association and the Congregationalist Church. Even before the Civil War, Avery Normal Institute's racially integrated faculty was providing quality educations for African Americans. She attended Syracuse University in 1931 and came to Washington, D.C., with her mother in 1932, after the death of her father.

Marguerite DeMond went to work as a researcher for African-American historian Carter G. Woodson's Association for the Study of African American Life and History. After a one-year courtship, she and Davis were married. They had four children, including Michael DeMond Davis, who became a journalist and author of Black American Women in Olympic Track and Field and the Thurgood Marshall biography.

Joint Committee on National Recovery
In the summer of 1933, John P. Davis, a law graduate, and Robert C. Weaver, a doctoral student at Harvard, acted to ensure that African-American interests were represented in government programs. The two men returned to Washington, D.C. and established an office on Capitol Hill, where they fought successfully against the racial wage differential and for the integration of Negro families into the program of the Homestead Subsistence Division in the first recovery program.

Davis and Weaver organized the Negro Industrial League to pressure New Deal agencies to address the needs of blacks. They monitored the hearings of the National Recovery Administration to ensure that blacks benefited from the program.

Their efforts led to the establishment of the Joint Committee on National Recovery (JCNR), a group of 26 national groups, including the YWCA, National Urban League (NUL), and the National Association for the Advancement of Colored People (NAACP). Davis became Executive Secretary of the JCNR, a position he held until 1936, serving as a legislative lobbyist. The committee lobbied for fair inclusion of African Americans in government-sponsored programs. It publicized incidents and patterns of racial discrimination. The implementation of a National Recovery Program promised to have immediate and long-term consequences for African Americans. While Davis and Weaver worked, more established African-American leaders deliberated about how to respond to the flurry of New Deal legislation.

National Negro Congress

In May 1935, a conference on the economic status of the Negro was held at Howard University in Washington, D.C., out of which emerged a major civil rights coalition that was active in the late 1930s and 1940s: the National Negro Congress (NNC)—whose sponsors included Davis, Ralph J. Bunche and Alain Locke of Howard University, A. Philip Randolph of the Brotherhood of Sleeping Car Porters, James Ford of the Communist Party USA, Lester Granger and Elmer Carter of the Urban League, and Charles Hamilton Houston of the NAACP. Davis was one of the original founders; he served as Executive Secretary until 1942.

The NNC represented one of the first efforts of the 20th century to bring together under one umbrella black secular leaders, preachers, labor organizers, workers, businessmen, radicals, and professional politicians, with the assumption that the common denominator of race could weld together such divergent segments of black society. It was the Communist Party’s effort to build support among activists in the black mainstream. The evolution of the NNC dramatized the growing convergence of outlook between Communists and activist black intellectuals that had taken shape in the protests of the early Depression years and reached full fruition during the years of the Popular Front.

In 1943, Davis brought the first lawsuit challenging segregated schools in Washington, D.C., in the name of his five-year-old son Michael D. Davis, who was rejected from his neighborhood's Noyes School, a white elementary school. The Washington Star newspaper criticized the African-American lawyer for legally challenging the District's dual segregated school system after the principal of Noyes School refused to admit Mike Davis. The Washington Star said that District citizens had long accepted separate schools for blacks and whites, and that the suit brought by John P. Davis would cause deeper racial divisions in the nation's capital.

In response to Davis' suit, the US Congress appropriated federal funds to construct the Lucy D. Slowe elementary school, for African-American children, directly across the street from his Brookland neighborhood home. At that time, a committee of Congress directly administered District government.

Our World magazine
After World War II, in 1946 Davis was founding publisher of Our World magazine, a full-size, nationally distributed magazine to appeal to African-American readers. Its first issue, with singer-actress Lena Horne on the cover, appeared on the nation's newsstands in April 1946. Our World was a premier publication, covering contemporary topics from black history to sports and entertainment, with regular articles on health, fashion, politics and social awareness. It was based in New York City, the publishing capital of the country.

Our World portrayed a thriving black America; its covers featured entertainers such as Lena Horne, Marian Anderson, Harry Belafonte, Eartha Kitt, Ella Fitzgerald, Louis Armstrong, Duke Ellington and Nat King Cole. The magazine ceased publication in 1957.

The American Negro Reference Book
In 1964, Davis served as editor of special publications for the Phelps-Stokes Fund. He compiled in a single volume a reliable summary on the main aspects of Negro life in America, presenting it with historical depth to provide the reader with a true perspective. The American Negro Reference Book covered virtually every aspect of African-American life, present and past.

Papers and collections
The largest collection of Davis' papers is in the Schomburg Center for Research in Black Culture, New York Public Library. Insight into Davis' political and social views can be found in his own writings. The Papers of the National Negro Congress reproduces all of the organization’s records that are housed at the Schomburg Center for Research in Black Culture, including the voluminous working files of Davis and successive executive secretaries of the National Negro Congress. Beginning with papers from 1933 that predate the formation of the National Negro Congress, the wide-ranging collection documents Davis’ involvement in the Negro Industrial League. It includes the "Report Files" of Davis’ interest in the "Negro problem."

The most extensive overview of Davis' life is by Hilmar Jenson in an edition of his writings, John Preston Davis, The Forgotten Civil Rights (1996). Much of the scholarly writing about Davis focuses on his experiences in the National Negro Congress.

Artifacts and papers of Davis are being acquired by the Smithsonian Institution's National Museum of African-American History and Culture.

References

Further reading

Anacostia Museum and Center for African American History and Culture and Eleanor Holmes Norton, The Black Washingtonians: The Anacostia Museum Illustrated Chronology, 2005
Beth Tompkins Bates, Pullman Porters and the Rise of Protest Politics in Black America, 1925–1945, 2000
Robert Branham and Melissa Friedling, Lift Every Voice. John Preston Davis and the National Negro Congress, documentary film, 1990
Sylvia G. L Dannett & others, "John P. Davis," The Negro Heritage Library (10-volume set), 1964
Arthur Paul Davis, From the Dark Tower: Afro-American Writers 1900 to 1960, 1974
Jack E. Davis, The Civil Rights Movement, 2000
"Remembering John P. Davis: The Forgotten Civil Rights Leader", International News Agency, November 2005
"What the 'New Deal' Means for the Negro," from John P. Davis, "A Black Inventory of the New Deal," The Crisis 42 (May 1935), 141–42, 154.
Michael D. Davis and Hunter Clark, Thurgood Marshall: Warrior at the Bar, Rebel on the Bench 
John Egerton, Speak Now Against the Day: The Generation Before the Civil Rights Movement in the South, Chapel Hill: University of North Carolina Press, 1995
Karen Ferguson, Black Politics in New Deal Atlanta, 2001 
John Hope Franklin, Mirror to America: The Autobiography of John Hope Franklin, 2005
V. P. Franklin, Black Self-Determination: A Cultural History of African-American Resistance, January 1993
James N. Gregory, The Southern Diaspora: How the Great Migrations of Black and White Southerners Transformed America, 2007
Charles V. Hamilton, Kwame Ture, Stokely Carmichael, and Charles Hamilton, Black Power: The Politics of Liberation, 1992
John H. Hinshaw and Paul Le Blanc, U.S. Labor in the 20th Century: Studies in Working-Class Struggles and Insurgency (Revolutionary Series), 2000
"Charles Hamilton Houston and John P. Davis Critique the Lily-White Tennessee Valley Authority, 1934", in Thomas C. Holt and Elsa Barkley Brown (eds), Major Problems in African-American History: From Freedom to "Freedom Now," 1865–1990s, New York: Houghton Mifflin, 2000, 
Langston Hughes and Arnold Rampersad, The Big Sea: An Autobiography, 1993
Hilmar L. Jensen III, The Rise of an African American Left: John P. Davis and the National Negro Congress, Bates College 
John H. Johnson, Succeeding Against The Odds, 1993
David Lewis, The Portable Harlem Renaissance Reader, Penguin, 1995
Genna Rae McNeil, "Before Brown: Reflections on Historical Context and Vision", American University Law Review 52, no.6 (2003): 1431–1460.
Kenneth W. Mack, "The Myth of Brown", Yale Law Journal, The Pocket Part, November 2005
Arwen P. Mohun, Steam Laundries: Gender, Technology, and Work in the United States and Great Britain, 1880—1940, 2002
Charles C. Moskos and John Sibley Butler, All That We Can Be: Black Leadership and Racial Integration the Army Way, 1997
Harvard Sitkoff, A New Deal for Blacks: The Emergence of Civil Rights As a National Issue: The Depression Decade, 1981
Thomas Sowell, Civil Rights: Rhetoric or Reality, 1985
Patricia Sullivan, Days of Hope - Race and Democracy in the New Deal Era 
John Edgar Tidwell and Mark A. Sanders, Sterling A. Brown's A Negro Looks at the South, 2007
Brian Urquhart, Ralph Bunche: An American Life, New York: W.W. Norton, 1993 [Paperback edition titled Ralph Bunche: An American Odyssey, 1998]
"John P. Davis Wins Debating Honors in the British Isles", The Washington Post, July 5, 1925

1905 births
1973 deaths
African-American lawyers
African-American writers
Activists for African-American civil rights
American activists
American male journalists
20th-century American journalists
American publishers (people)
Bates College alumni
Harlem Renaissance
Harvard Law School alumni
20th-century American lawyers
20th-century American writers
20th-century African-American people
Lawyers from Washington, D.C.